Jorge Aparicio may refer to:

 Jorge Aparicio (Mexican footballer) (born 1989), Mexican football midfielder
 Jorge Aparicio (Guatemalan footballer) (born 1992), Guatemalan football midfielder